Doctor Guillermo Mann Base (formerly Camp Shirreff) is a Chilean Antarctic research base. It is located on the east side of Cape Shirreff on Ioannes Paulus II Peninsula on Livingston Island in the South Shetland Islands off the Antarctic peninsula.

It is adjacent to the Shirreff Base that is administrated by the United States.

The base is named after the Chilean zoologist, naturalist and ecologist Guillermo Mann, who participated in 1947 on the first Chilean Antarctic Expedition.

This base should not to be confused with the old Doctor Guillermo Mann or Spring-INACH Base from 1973 that is located in the Spring Point, Hughes Bay. Today that base is not operational.

See also
 List of Antarctic research stations
 List of Antarctic field camps

References

External links
 Official website Chilean Antarctic Institute

Chilean Antarctic Territory
Outposts of the South Shetland Islands
1991 establishments in Antarctica